S Carinae (HD 88366) is a variable star in the constellation Carina.

S Carinae is an M-type red giant with a mean apparent magnitude of +6.94.  It is approximately 1,620 light years from Earth.  It is classified as a Mira type variable star and its brightness varies between magnitude +4.5 and +10.0 with a period of 149.49 days.  It has one of the earliest spectral types, and hence the hottest temperatures, of any Mira variable, and has a relatively short period for the class.  The temperature of this pulsing star is highest at visual brightness maximum and lowest at visual brightness minimum.

S Carinae has exhausted its core hydrogen and expanded to become a red giant.  It has also exhausted its core helium and evolved to the asymptotic giant branch, where it fuses hydrogen and helium in separate shells outside the core.

References

Carina (constellation)
Mira variables
M-type giants
Carinae, S
088366
3999
049751
Durchmusterung objects